The 1920 Colgate football team was an American football team that represented Colgate University as an independent during the 1920 college football season. In its second season under head coach Ellery Huntington Jr., the team compiled a 1–5–2 record and was outscored by a total of 119 to 114. D. Belford West was the team captain. The team played its home games on Whitnall Field in Hamilton, New York.

Schedule

References

Colgate
Colgate Raiders football seasons
Colgate football